Marinobacter nanhaiticus is a Gram-negative, facultatively anaerobic and slightly halophilic bacterium from the genus of Marinobacter which has been isolated from sediments from the South China Sea. Marinobacter nanhaiticus has the ability to degrade polycyclic aromatic hydrocarbons.

References

Further reading 
 
 

Alteromonadales
Bacteria described in 2013